Rufino R. Díaz Palomo (born 1922) is a former Negro league second baseman who played in the 1940s.

Diaz played for the New York Cubans during their 1947 Negro World Series championship season.

References

External links
 and Seamheads 

1922 births
Possibly living people
Date of birth missing
Place of birth missing
New York Cubans players
Baseball second basemen